These are the international rankings by various organizations of the Democratic Republic of the Congo.

References

Congo, Democratic Republic of the